Michael Durant is an American retired Army pilot and 2022 U.S. Senate candidate in Alabama.

Michael Durant may also refer to:

 Michael Durant (cricketer), a South African-born Namibian cricketer
 Mike Durant (baseball), a retired Major League Baseball catcher